Malcolm Elmore Brown (July 18, 1899 – September 13, 1951), nicknamed "Scrappy", was an American Negro league shortstop between 1920 and 1930.

A native of Sparrows Point, Maryland, Brown made his Negro leagues debut in 1920 with the Hilldale Club. He went on to play for several teams, including five seasons with the Baltimore Black Sox, and finished his career with a two-year stint with the Brooklyn Royal Giants in 1929 and 1930. Brown died in Washington, D.C., in 1951 at age 52.

References

External links
 and Baseball-Reference Black Baseball stats and Seamheads

1899 births
1951 deaths
Bacharach Giants players
Baltimore Black Sox players
Brooklyn Royal Giants players
Harrisburg Giants players
Hilldale Club players
Homestead Grays players
20th-century African-American sportspeople
Baseball infielders